Melih Abdulhayoğlu (born March 10, 1968) is the CEO of MAVeCap, an incubator Venture Capital firm funded by his family office. MAVeCap focusses on building tomorrow's technology platform companies. His first company was Comodo The firm is now branded as Sectigo.

Early life
Melih Abdulhayoglu was born in Turkey, where he studied at Hatay high-school. At the age of 18, he moved to the United Kingdom, where he earned a Bachelor of Science in Electronic Engineering from the University of Bradford in 1991.

Career
Abdulhayoglu is the founder of Comodo, an internet security company, and established the industry standards organization CA/Browser Forum in 2005, initially to promote new standards that resulted in the creation of Extended Validation SSL Certificates.

In 2009, Abdulhayoglu organized the Common Computing Security Standards Forum, initially to deal with the problem of faux antivirus software being used by cyber-criminals.

Abdulhayoglu features in Forbes Turkey's 12th "100 Richest Turks" list, announced in March, 2017. Forbes announced that he is estimated net worth of US$1.6 billion as of April 2018.

References

External links
 
 Melih Abdulhayoğlu
 Comodo Newsroom - Melih in the News
 CNN Interview
ESecurityPlanet Interview

Turkish emigrants to the United States
Living people
1968 births
Alumni of the University of Bradford
American technology chief executives
People from Hatay Province